My Unmarried Wife is a 1918 silent film drama directed by George Siegmann and starring Carmel Myers.  The film was based on the novel Molly and I and the Silver Ring by Frank R. Adams.

Cast
Carmel Myers as Mary Cunningham
Kenneth Harlan as Phillip Smith
Beatrice Van as ?unknown role
Pat Calhoun as Jack Herrick
Mark Fenton as Dr. Allen
Jack Hutchinson as Tonio

Preservation status
A complete print is preserved at the George Eastman House in Rochester, New York.

References

External links

  lobby poster(ha)

1918 films
American silent feature films
American black-and-white films
Silent American drama films
1918 drama films
Universal Pictures films
Films directed by George Siegmann
Surviving American silent films
1910s American films